Messner is a surname. It is an occupational name of Austro-Bavarian origin, in which dialect it means sacristan/sexton.

People with the name Messner include:

 Carrie Messner (born 1977), American long-distance runner 
 Franz Josef Messner (1896–1945), Austrian resistance leader
 Fritz Messner (1912–1945), German field hockey player
 Günther Messner (1946–1970), Italian mountaineer
 Heinrich Messner (born 1939), Austrian alpine skier and Olympic medalist
 Johannes Messner (1891–1984), Austrian economist
 Johnny Messner (1909–1986), American big/swing bandleader
 Johnny Messner (born 1970), American actor
 Joseph Messner (1893–1969), Austrian composer
 Karl Messner (born 1970), American musician
 Mark Messner (born 1965), American football player
 Marland Messner (1934–1993), American actor and writer of soap operas
 Michael Messner (born 1952), American sociologist
 Mirko Messner (born 1948), Austrian Slavist
 Pat Messner (born 1954), Canadian water skier
 Reinhold Messner (born 1944), Italian mountaineer
 Roe Messner (born 1935), American building contractor
 Tammy Faye Messner (1942–2007), American evangelist
 Tony Messner (born 1939), Australian politician
 Willi Messner (born 1940), German swimmer
 Wolfgang Messner (born 1971), German Professor of International Management
 Zbigniew Messner (1929–2014), Polish economist and politician
 William Messner-Loebs (born 1949), American comic book writer

See also
6077 Messner, asteroid named after Reinhold Messner 
Messner Mountain Museum, Reinhold Messner museum project at 5 locations in South Tyrol
The Unauthorized Biography of Reinhold Messner, music record NOT referring to the mountaineer
Meissner
Messmer (disambiguation)

German-language surnames
Occupational surnames